Mauro Zani (born 22 November 1949) is an Italian politician.

Mauro Zani was born in Sala Bolognese (province of Bologna, Emilia-Romagna).
He has been Regional councilor in Emilia-Romagna, municipal and provincial councilor of Bologna, President of the Province of Bologna (1985–1987), Member of the Chamber of Deputies (1994–2004) and Member of the European Parliament for the North-East constituency (2004–009).

Career
 Diploma in technical subjects
 1972-1975: Secretary of Italian Communist Youth Federation (FGCI) of Bologna
 1988-1991: Secretary of the Bologna Federation of the Italian Communist Party and Democratic Party of the Left (PDS)
 1991-1992: Regional Secretary of the PDS for Emilia-Romagna
 member (1992-1994) and coordinator (1994-1997) of the national secretariat of the PDS
 1999: Secretary of the Bologna Federation of the DS
 2000-2002: Emilia-Romagna Regional Secretary of the DS
 1976-1980: Member of the Regional Council of Emilia-Romagna
 1990-1992: Member of the Bologna Provincial Council (1980-1990) and of Bologna Municipal Council
 1985-1987: Vice-Chairman and then Chairman of the Council of Bologna Province
 1994-2004: Member of the Chamber of Deputies of Italy
 1996-2001: Vice-Chairman of the DS-Ulivo parliamentary group
 2001-2004: Vice-Chairman of the permanent committee on European Union policies

See also
2004 European Parliament election in Italy

External links

1949 births
Living people
People from the Province of Bologna
Italian Communist Party politicians
Democratic Party of the Left politicians
Democrats of the Left politicians
20th-century Italian politicians
MEPs for Italy 2004–2009
21st-century Italian politicians
Democrats of the Left MEPs